Nola angulata is a moth of the family Nolidae first described by Frederic Moore in 1888. It is found in India and Sri Lanka.

References

Moths of Asia
Moths described in 1888
angulata